Gloeocarpus is a genus of Sapindaceae containing the single plant species Gloeocarpus patentivalvis. It is endemic to the Philippines.

References

Monotypic Sapindaceae genera
Sapindaceae
Endemic flora of the Philippines
Endangered flora of Asia
Taxonomy articles created by Polbot